BUB Seven Streamliner is an American-built streamliner motorcycle that held the motorcycle land-speed record from 2006 to 2008 and again from 2009 to 2010. BUB Seven and two other streamliners traded the title of "world's fastest motorcycle" during official speed runs at Bonneville Speedway in the summer of 2006. The other two competitors were Ack Attack and the EZ-Hook streamliner. In 2017, Valerie Thompson rode BUB Seven for more record attempts at Bonneville.

Design
Design for the streamliner is attributed to Motorcycle Hall of Fame inductee Denis Manning, who is also the owner, although it was listed for sale in 2010.  Additional design work for the purpose-built V-4 engine was provided by Joe Harralson of Sierra Design Engineering.  According to Harralson, the only off the shelf component in the engine is the oil filter. Manning has stated that the aerodynamic shape was inspired by the Coho salmon, who he observed swimming  in the Columbia River.

Manning had previously built Cal Rayborn's 1970 world speed record motorcycle, using a similar streamlined fairing built from a surplus jet drop tank.

Specifications
Weight: 
Length : 
Height: 
Width: 
Coefficient of drag: 0.08 or 0.09

References

Further reading

External links

Motorcycles of the United States
Land speed record motorcycles
Feet forwards motorcycles
Streamliner motorcycles